The Philippines competed at the 2012 Summer Paralympics in London, United Kingdom from August 29 to September 9, 2012. This was the nation's fifth time to send athletes to the Games. Philippine Sports Association for the Differently Abled-NPC Philippines fielded 9 athletes to compete in four sports. The 2012 Philippine Paralympic team was the biggest Philippine delegation since the 1988 Paralympics in Seoul, South Korea. Although no medals were won by the 9 athletes, Josephine Medina's performance in table tennis was the best finish for the Philippines, having ranked 4th overall in Paralympic Table Tennis standings.

Athletics 

Men's Track and Road Events

Men's Field Events

Women's Field Events

Powerlifting 

Men

Women

Swimming

Women

Table tennis 

Women

See also
Philippines at the Olympics
Philippines at the Paralympics
Philippines at the 2012 Summer Olympics

References

External links
Paralympic sports

Nations at the 2012 Summer Paralympics
2012
2012 in Philippine sport